The Alau Ice Palace is an 8,000-seat speed skating oval in Nur-Sultan, Kazakhstan. As well as speed skating it is also used for other sports. It was opened in 2011. The center hosted the speed skating events at the 2011 Asian Winter Games. In 2015, it hosted the World Sprint Speed Skating Championships. It was ranked first among the world’s speed skating stadiums according to the Dutch AD Sportwereld publication’s ranking.

For judo it was the venue for the 2015 World Judo Championships in August 2015 and for ice speedway it hosted final 1 of the 2018 Individual Ice Racing World Championship.

History
Construction of The Oval began in 2007, nearly four years after Astana and Almaty had been designated hosts of the 2011 Asian Winter Games. Construction was completed by the end of the summer of 2011, officially opening in December 2011, two months before the beginning of the Games.
The Alau Ice Palace was designed as the first covered speed skating oval in Kazakhstan, and as the second ever artificially frozen speed skating venue after Medeu. Being domed, this would give the facility the ability to control climate conditions inside to produce the highest quality ice possible.
The Alau is an artificially frozen indoor skating rink with a standard speed skating track of 400 meters to the lap. The radii of the inner and outer competition lanes are 26 and 30 meters respectively. The width of each competition lane is 4 meters with an inside training lane of 4 meters.

When not hosting speed skating competitions, The Oval is open to public skating and family day events.

It has also hosted national youth championships in rink bandy.

Track records

References

External links

Official website
Alau Ice Palace on SpeedSkatingNews.info
SCADA visualization and control system of the Alau Ice Palace

Indoor arenas in Kazakhstan
Indoor speed skating venues
Speed skating venues in Kazakhstan
Sports venues in Astana